Honan's Block and 112–114 Main Street are a pair of joined commercial buildings in Woonsocket, Rhode Island.  Honan's Block (108–110 Main Street) is a visually distinctive three-story brick Stick/Eastlake-style building erected in 1879.  The adjacent 112–114 Main Street is an L-shaped two-story block which wraps around the rear of the Honan Block.  The two buildings were joined via internal connections in 1938–39, at which time the facades of both buildings were significantly altered, although the Honan Block has retained its distinctive Late Victorian cast-iron elements.

The buildings were listed on the National Register of Historic Places in 1989, and contribute to the 1991 Main Street Historic District.

See also
National Register of Historic Places listings in Providence County, Rhode Island

References

Commercial buildings completed in 1879
Commercial buildings on the National Register of Historic Places in Rhode Island
Buildings and structures in Woonsocket, Rhode Island
National Register of Historic Places in Providence County, Rhode Island
Historic district contributing properties in Rhode Island